María Eugenia Campos Galván (born 11 September 1975), commonly known as Maru Campos, is a Mexican politician from the National Action Party (PAN) who serves as the current Governor of Chihuahua. From 2006 to 2009, she served as a deputy of the LX Legislature of the Mexican Congress representing Chihuahua.

In 2016 she was elected the first female municipal president of Chihuahua, being re-elected in 2018 for a second term.

In 2021 she was nominated by PAN as its candidate in the 2021 Mexican gubernatorial elections.

Early life 

María Eugenia Campos Galván was born on 11 September 1975. She is the daughter of Manuel Campos Cepeda, an engineer, and María Eugenia Galván Antillón (es), who was a deputy for the National Action Party (PAN) in the Mexican Congress' LVIII Legislature. Campos Galván earned a degree in Law at the Monterrey Institute of Technology and Higher Education (ITESM) and a master's degree in Latin American Studies and Government at the School of Foreign Service at Georgetown University. She earned an additional master's degree in Public Administration and Public Policy at the Mexico City campus of her alma mater.

She worked as an advisor to the PAN in the Congress of Chihuahua and state secretary for PAN's Youth Action in Chihuahua. In 2001, she served as an official of the General Directorate of Political Development of the Ministry of the Interior.

Early political career

Federal deputy and delegate of Liconsa 
She was elected plurinominal federal deputy to the LX Legislature from 2006 to 2009. There, she served as secretary of the Foreign Relations Committee and member of the Federal District and Public Function committees, in addition to the Special Committee on State Reform.

In 2010, as a delegate of Liconsa, a state-owned company in the social development sector whose purpose is to contribute to the overcoming of food poverty, she denounced an ongoing diversion of resources involving the company Industrias Lácteas de Chihuahua, and a subsidiary of Spain's Reny Picot. 

In May 2011, after receiving threats, she resigned from her position for personal security reasons. Her brother, Guillermo Federico Campos Galván, who was coordinator of federal delegations in the State of Chihuahua, died in a car accident in Mexico City on 14 November 2011 after attending the funeral of Francisco Blake Mora.

In 2012, she ran as PAN's candidate for federal deputy for Chihuahua's VIII Federal Electoral District, but did not win the election.

State deputy and candidate for Mayor of Chihuahua 
In 2013, she was elected Deputy to the Chihuahua State Congress for the XVII Chihuahua State Electoral District for the LXIV Legislature for the 2013–2016 period. In 2016, she requested leave as deputy to run as PAN's candidate for municipal president of Chihuahua, being elected on 5 June 2016, thus being the first female mayor elected in Chihuahua.

Mayor of Chihuahua 

On 10 October 2016, she was sworn in as mayor of Chihuahua. On 28 January 2018, Campos Galván registered as a candidate for mayor of Chihuahua in order to seek re-election in the 2018 elections.

On 17 May 2018, she requested leave from the city council to seek re-election as mayor, leaving Marco Antonio Bonilla Mendoza in her place. Campos Galván was re-elected with 203,823 votes, greater than the vote in the first election. On 8 August 2018, she resumed her activities as mayor at the end of her leave requested in May.

On 8 April 2019, Campos Galván presented the project "Iluminemos Chihuahua" that contemplated the renovation of 81,500 lights in the city of Chihuahua through a 15-year tender to a private firm for around $6.2 billion pesos. In November 2019, after various requests from various civil organizations, a referendum was held that leaned in favor of the project not being carried out. At a press conference shortly after the referendum, Campos Galván announced the cancellation of the project.

In May 2019, Maru Campos was a featured speaker at the 3rd annual Smart Cities New York, which bills itself as "North America's leading global conference to harness the $1.6 trillion global smart city marketplace."

Bilateral commission agreement with Albuquerque 

In June 2019, Campos signed a historic bilateral commission agreement with Albuquerque Mayor Tim Keller. The agreement seeks to strengthen ties  between the cities by creating an Albuquerque – Chihuahua protocol for economic development, tourism and cultural exchange, public safety, and education. 

“This new Commission will create trade and culture connections between us and our sister city Chihuahua, Mexico,” said Mayor Keller. “When you’re in Chihuahua, you can feel how much we share from the high desert landscapes to green chile, along with so much of the history and culture. We are taking the responsibility to step up and demonstrate that cities can help lead the way toward inter-border collaboration. Together, we will work towards strengthening economic development, tourism and culture, public safety, and education."

In October 2019, Campos presented a talk at the LAPA Georgetown forum on the role of Local Governments in the Fight Against Insecurity. The talk is available for view at the LAPA Georgetown page on Facebook.

She currently serves as vice president of Communication of the National Association of Mayors (ANAC), and from 8 March to 14 October 2020, she was president of the National Conference of Municipalities of Mexico (CONAMM), succeeding Morenista Armando Quintero Martínez.

Controversies

Accusations of secret payments from César Duarte 
In January 2021, the Attorney General of Chihuahua accused Campos Galván of having received bribes for at least 10.3 million pesos between 2014 and 2016 from the former governor of the state César Duarte Jáquez, currently imprisoned in the United States for embezzlement of the state treasury and criminal association. It is alleged  that the payments were made during the time Campos Galván was vice-coordinator of the PAN caucus in the local Congress, between 2014 and 2015, and also in 2016, when she was a candidate for the mayor of Chihuahua City for the first time. This accusation of the State Prosecutor's Office for the crime of bribery is found in criminal case 2821/2020. Copies of receipts supposedly signed by Campos Galván have been released.

On 28 March, she was forced to surrender her passport and pay a MXN $500,000 bond for accusations of bribery. On 1 April, she was linked to the process, after a hearing of more than 42 hours, in which the defense could not reject the evidence presented by the Public Ministry. The judge admitted as evidence the 34 receipts allegedly signed by Campos Galván that supposedly account for the delivery of the money from the time when she acted as sub-coordinator of the PAN caucus in the State Congress.

She announced that she will enter the electoral campaign with "great confidence and strength", to seek that the institutions fulfill their duty and serve the citizens, "not only for persecution such as the one unleashed against the state government, and particularly the governor Javier Corral Jurado."

She has accused Corral of intending to hand over the state to the National Regeneration Movement (Morena), for which he resorted to "rigged statements, fabrication of evidence, misuse of institutions, threats and a collusion of political actors, a cast of characters from state government and other parties."

Investigation of corruption and bribery of service provider companies 
Campos Galván is also under investigation by the Special Prosecutor's Office for Combating Corruption for the crimes of bribery and misuse of illegal powers and powers, having allegedly bribed suppliers of her government as mayor of Chihuahua. Campos allegedly received from contractor companies of the City of Chihuahua monthly payments for more than 1.3 million pesos between 2017 and 2018, and allegedly ordered the award of contracts for cleaning and maintenance of bridges, parks and municipal gardens to five companies that, according to the audit, were linked to each other and simulated competition in the bidding processes. 

On 15 April 2021 at 5:38 pm, the Eighth District Court announced to the High Court of Justice the provisional injunction in favor of Campos Galván, derived from the appeal of a constitutional challenge (writ of amparo) under number 554/2021.

On 16 April, 2021, Judge Ramón Gerardo Holguín Licón deferred the hearing against María Eugenia Campos Galván under criminal case 3022/2020 after a provisional injunction that prevents the formulation of charges pending delivery of a full copy of the investigation file.

In a message to the media and to voters, Campos Galván has assured the public that simply being linked to an investigation does not mean guilt, or even that the accusations have been confirmed. 

She pointed out that being involved in the process did not mean that the accusations were true, and that this does not affect her political rights, so she would continue with her campaign for the governorship of Chihuahua. "I don't give up, I don't give in," Campos Galván said.

Campos Galván stressed that her rights to vote and stand for election as a candidate for governor of Chihuahua, remain intact. “The link to the process that has been defined today does not mean that the public prosecutor has been right, nor does it mean that their accusations have been confirmed. The definition of the judge is not a finding of criminal responsibility,” said Campos.

Campos Galván said that she looked forward to demonstrating that "the accusations are false," and that the whole process against her is "a political persecution based on falsified statements, fabrication of evidence, use of institutions, threats and a collusion of political actors, figures of the state government and other parties, with the intention of spreading lies, deceive citizens and damage the relationship of trust" that she has built with the people of Chihuahua.

References 

1975 births
Living people
People from Chihuahua City
Women governors of States of Mexico
Women members of the Chamber of Deputies (Mexico)
Members of the Chamber of Deputies (Mexico) for Chihuahua (state)
National Action Party (Mexico) politicians
21st-century Mexican politicians
21st-century Mexican women politicians
Monterrey Institute of Technology and Higher Education alumni
Municipal presidents of Chihuahua
Governors of Chihuahua (state)
Politicians from Chihuahua (state)
Deputies of the LX Legislature of Mexico
Mexican Roman Catholics